The 2020–21 OFI Crete F.C. season was the club's 96th season in existence and the third consecutive season in the top flight of Greek football. In addition to the domestic league, OFI participated in this season's editions of the Greek Football Cup and the UEFA Europa League. The season covered the period from 20 July 2020 to 30 June 2021.

Players

First-team squad

Transfers

In

Out

Pre-season and friendlies

Competitions

Overview

Super League 1

League table

Results summary

Results by matchday

Matches

Play out round

Results summary

Results by matchday

Matches

Greek Football Cup

Sixth Round

UEFA Europa League

Statistics

Goalscorers

References

External links

OFI Crete F.C. seasons
OFI
OFI